Sundarnath Suvarna was an Indian cinematographer of the Kannada Film industry from the late 1970s. He was a c
cinematographer for over 150 Kannada films and he also produced and directed some films. His daughters run a studio in memory of their father. The first daughter Amruthavarshini manages the place. The second daughter Akshata is the HR and the third daughter Sathyashree

Career
Suvarna worked as a cinematographer on Sri Manjunatha, Mussanjemathu,  Operation Antha, Anuraaga Sangama and Lockup Death as well as other films. He was also famous for his work in the record breaking film Bangar Patler of the coastal cinema industry. He was a renowned artist who successfully portrayed Tulu culture in his films. He had also worked with Kannada Jnanpith award winner novelist Shivaram Karanth in the Tulu film September 8 Awards. The State Government has also honoured him with Rajyothsava Award.

References

1950 births
2013 deaths
Kannada film cinematographers
Cinematographers from Karnataka
Artists from Mangalore
21st-century Indian photographers